Marie François Fouquet (1590–1681),
was a French medical writer and philanthropist.

She was born to Gilles de Maupeou, and married to François IV Fouquet (1587–1640). 

She was the manager of the hospital Dame de la Charité de l'Hôtel-Dieu in Paris (1634), director of the hospital l'Hôpital des Filles de la Providence in Paris (1658), and manager of the hospital des Dames de la Propagation de La Foi (1664).

She wrote a book which was published in 1685: Les remèdes charitables de Madame Fouquet, pour guérir à peu de frais toute forme de maux tant internes qu'externes, invéterez, et qui ont passé jusques à présent pour incurables, experimentez par la même dame : et augmentez de la méthode que l'on pratique à l'Hôtel des Invalides pour guérir les soldats de la vérole; this was a medical work which described medical experiments and treatments she herself had developed to cure various illnesses, among them syphilis. 

One of the craters of Venus is named after her.

References

Louis-Gabriel Michaud, Biographie universelle, ancienne et moderne, ou histoire, par ordre alphabétique, de la vie publique ou privée de tous les hommes qui se sont fait remarquer par leurs écrits, leurs actions, leurs talents, leurs vertus ou leurs crimes, vol. 15, p. 355, éd. L.-G. Michaud, 1816

1590 births
1681 deaths
17th-century French women writers